Harold Lee Woods (born December 24, 1955) is a Canadian football player who played professionally for the  Saskatchewan Roughriders, Hamilton Tiger-Cats, Toronto Argonauts and Montreal Concordes.

References

1955 births
Living people
Canadian football defensive backs
Saskatchewan Roughriders players
Hamilton Tiger-Cats players
Toronto Argonauts players
Montreal Concordes players
Washington Federals/Orlando Renegades players
West Virginia Mountaineers football players